Pyrocyon ("fire dog") is a genus of small carnivorous hyaenodontids that lived in North America during the early Eocene. Fossils of Pyrocyon have been found in Wyoming and Colorado. Weight of Pyrocyon dioctetus has been estimated at around 2.6 kilograms.

Phylogeny
The phylogenetic relationships of genus Pyrocyon are shown in the following cladogram.

See also
 Mammal classification
 Hyaenodonta

References

Hyaenodonts
Eocene mammals
Eocene mammals of North America
Eocene genus first appearances
Prehistoric placental genera